Dr. Silvano Raia is a Brazilian surgeon who specializes in liver diseases. He is a professor emeritus at the Faculty of Medicine of the University of São Paulo (FMUSP).

Raia was the first doctor to achieve a successful living donor liver transplantation in July 1989.

Notes

Year of birth missing (living people)
Living people
Brazilian transplant surgeons